Masongill is a small community on the edge of the Craven district of North Yorkshire, England.  The village, in the Yorkshire Dales, lies near the border of Lancashire to the west, and the nearby hamlet of Ireby.

St. Mary's Church Ingleton contains a memorial to one Randall Hopley Sherlock (brother of the vicar, Todd Sherlock) struck and killed by lightning at Ingleton station), and several locations in the area include the word Holme. Mary Doyle (mother of Arthur Conan Doyle) lived in Masongill from 1882 to 1917, and Conan Doyle (creator of Sherlock Holmes) was a frequent visitor. So some do wonder if the name of Sherlock Holmes came from Masongill. Doyle would have arrived by train at Ingleton (Midland) railway station and continued his journey to Masongill by cart. This would have taken him through Holme Head, below Ingleton viaduct. Doyle married his first wife in 1885 at nearby St Oswald's Church, Thornton in Lonsdale.

Another person of interest in the history of Masongill is Dr. Bryan Charles Waller (1853–1932). Waller was Squire of Masongill from 1877 and, from 1879, he was a lecturer in Pathology at the University of Edinburgh, having already attained his MD there. During his time in Edinburgh he took lodgings with the Doyle family and quickly became a dominant factor in their lives. It was he who persuaded Conan Doyle to train as a doctor, and his mother to come and live in Masongill.

Doyle and Waller were big men with strong characters and their relationship deteriorated to such an extent that they came to blows. Waller was only 6 years older than Doyle, so 15 years younger than Mary! Also, Waller married in August 1896. Nevertheless, Mary Doyle remained as tenant of Masongill Cottage until 1917, when she moved south. She preferred the regular company of Waller to the irregular companionship of her son.

References

External links

Villages in North Yorkshire